Sayuri Maruyama (born December 22, 1975) is a Japanese sprint canoer who competed from the mid-1990s to the early 2000s (decade). At the 1996 Summer Olympics in Atlanta, she was eliminated in the semifinals of both the K-1 500 m and the K-4 500 m events. Four years later in Sydney, Maruyama was eliminated in the heats of the K-1 500 m event.

External links
Sports-Reference.com profile

1975 births
Canoeists at the 1996 Summer Olympics
Canoeists at the 2000 Summer Olympics
Japanese female canoeists
Living people
Olympic canoeists of Japan
Asian Games medalists in canoeing
Canoeists at the 1994 Asian Games
Canoeists at the 1998 Asian Games
Medalists at the 1994 Asian Games
Medalists at the 1998 Asian Games
Asian Games silver medalists for Japan
Asian Games bronze medalists for Japan